Jane C. Charlton (born June 5, 1965) is a professor of astronomy and astrophysics at Pennsylvania State University where she is a specialist in galaxy formation and evolution. She also has a daughter named Thomasin.

Early life and education
Charlton was born in New Eagle, Pennsylvania. She was a child prodigy who obtained her Bachelor of Science in chemistry and physics from Carnegie Mellon University at the age of 18, in 1983. Charlton received both her PhD, in 1987, and her Master of Science, 1984, from the University of Chicago.

Publications 
Jane C. Charlton, Microsoft Academic Search

References

Living people
1965 births
Pennsylvania State University faculty
American women astronomers
Carnegie Mellon University alumni
University of Chicago alumni
People from Washington County, Pennsylvania